The United States national indoor lacrosse team represents the U.S. in box lacrosse at the World Indoor Lacrosse Championship. Team USA has won the bronze medal in all four WILC tournaments. The team is organized by US Lacrosse, the national governing body. US Indoor Lacrosse was named to form and manage the 2007 and 2011 Teams.  The roster usually consists of professional players, some of which play in the National Lacrosse League or Major League Lacrosse.

2007 FIL
At the 2007 ILF World Indoor Lacrosse Championship, the tournament took place between May 14 and 20 at the Halifax Metro Centre in Halifax, Nova Scotia, Canada. Canada was the defending champion and again beat the Iroquois Nationals in the final, this time 15–14 in overtime.  Team USA defeated England 17–10 to win their second bronze medal.

2011 WILC

At the 2011 FIL World Indoor Lacrosse Championship, Team USA came very close to reaching the gold medal game. In group play, they were beaten by the Iroquois Nationals only by one goal, 10–11. Their semi-final game was very close too, when they lost to Canada 10–15. In the bronze medal game, Team USA beat the Czech Republic 16–7. Casey Powell was named tournament MVP.

2019 WILC
The roster for the 2019 World Indoor Lacrosse Championship was announced on July 25, 2019.

References

External links
Team USA official website
U.S. Indoor Lacrosse

Lacrosse teams in the United States
National lacrosse teams
lacrosse